Annapurni Subramaniam is the director of the Indian Institute of Astrophysics, Bangalore and works on areas like star clusters, stellar evolution and population in galaxies and Magellanic clouds.

Education
Subramaniam finished her schooling from Victoria College, Palakkad, in science. She did her PhD on the topic "Studies of star clusters and stellar evolution" from Indian Institute of Astrophysics in 1996.

Career
Subramaniam was a Research Fellow at the Indian Institute of Astrophysics from 1990 to 1996. She then became a Post Doctoral Fellow in 1998 at the institute and currently works as a professor and director of institute. She is an active member of the International Astronomical Union.

Field of research
Subramaniam's major field of research includes:
 Star clusters (open and globular)
 Star formation and pre-MS stars
 Classical Be & Herbig Ae/Be stars
 Galactic structure
 Magellanic Clouds
 Stellar population 
Her list of publications can be found on the Astronomy Database

Current projects
At Indian Institute of Astrophysics, her current projects include:
 Emission line stars in star clusters
 Star formation history of young star clusters 
 Candidate old open clusters - unraveling the old disk
 Accurate photometry of unstudied open clusters
 Halo of the Small Magellanic Cloud
 Stellar population in the Large Magellanic Cloud
 Outer limits Survey: Magellanic Clouds

References

Articles created or expanded during Women's History Month (India) - 2014
Living people
20th-century Indian women scientists
Scientists from Palakkad
Government Victoria College, Palakkad alumni
Women astronomers
Scientists from Kerala
20th-century Indian astronomers
Indian astrophysicists
Women astrophysicists
Indian women physicists
20th-century Indian physicists
Women scientists from Kerala
Year of birth missing (living people)